The 1947 Chico State Wildcats football team represented Chico State College—now known as California State University, Chico—as a member of the Far Western Conference (FWC) during the 1947 college football season. Led by sixth-year head coach Roy Bohler, Chico State compiled an overall record of 4–5 with a mark of 1–3 in conference play, tying for fourth place in the FWC. The team was outscored by its opponents 111 to 109 for the season. The Wildcats played home games at Chico High School Stadium in Chico, California.

Schedule

Notes

References

Chico State
Chico State Wildcats football seasons
Chico State Wildcats football